Doney may refer to: A name that means 'eternal sunshine'

People
 George Edward Doney (1758–1809), believed to have been born in Gambia around 1758
 Victor Doney (1881–1961), Australian politician

Places
 Doney Park, Arizona, United States
 Gran Caffè Doney, Florence, Italy